Haydarlı is a town (belde) and municipality in the Dinar District, Afyonkarahisar Province, Turkey. Its population is 2,042 (2021). It consists of 7 quarters, including Ocaklı.

References

Towns in Turkey
Populated places in Afyonkarahisar Province
Dinar District